Corkhill is a surname. Notable people with the surname include:

Fictional family in the Channel 4 soap opera Brookside
Billy Corkhill
Diana Corkhill
Doreen Corkhill (née Brogan)
Jackie Corkhill (née Walker)
Jimmy Corkhill
Lindsey Corkhill
Little Jimmy Corkhill
Sheila Corkhill or Sheila Grant
Bill Corkhill (1910–1978), Northern Irish footballer
Pearl Corkhill MM (1887–1985), Australian military nurse of the First World War
Pop Corkhill (1858–1921), baseball player who played for ten seasons in the Major Leagues

See also
Corker Hill
Corkerhill
Corkill

Manx-language surnames